Christian Schwegler (born 6 June 1984) is a former footballer from Switzerland who played as defender.

Career
Christian joined Red Bull Salzburg during the summer of 2009 from Young Boys Bern for a fee of €0.6m. During the Red Bulls' 6–1 win over SV Mattersburg on 27 March 2010, Schwegler scored his first goal since joining the club.

Playing style
Schwegler is known for his long throw-ins.

Personal life

He is the brother of Pirmin Schwegler.

Honors
Austrian Champion (5): 2010, 2012, 2014, 2015, 2016
Austrian Cup (4): 2012, 2014, 2015, 2016

References

External links
Red Bull Salzburg profile 
football.ch profile
Guardian Football Stats

1984 births
People from Willisau District
Swiss-German people
Living people
Swiss men's footballers
Switzerland under-21 international footballers
Association football defenders
FC Luzern players
Arminia Bielefeld players
BSC Young Boys players
FC Red Bull Salzburg players
Swiss Challenge League players
Oberliga (football) players
Swiss Super League players
Austrian Football Bundesliga players
Swiss expatriate footballers
Expatriate footballers in Germany
Swiss expatriate sportspeople in Germany
Expatriate footballers in Austria
Swiss expatriate sportspeople in Austria
Sportspeople from the canton of Lucerne